Language secessionism (also known as linguistic secessionism or linguistic separatism) is an attitude supporting the separation of a language variety from the language to which it has hitherto been considered to belong, in order to make this variety be considered a distinct language. This phenomenon was first analyzed in Catalan sociolinguistics but it is attested in other parts of the world.

In Arabic

Sociolinguistic background 
The most critical factor that shapes the sociolinguistic reality of the Arab World is the phenomenon of diglossia. Diglossia is defined complementary distribution of two varieties of the same language used in different domains of life. The low-prestige variety of Colloquial Arabic dominates the sphere of spontaneous utterances and daily communication, whereas Standard Arabic carries high prestige and is used informal writing and speaking. 

This situation has important political and social implications. Arabic, meaning Standard Arabic, is the official language of all 22 member-states of the Arab League (and Syria, whose membership has been suspended). As such it automatically acquires a status of a global language. Standard Arabic is also the lingua sacra of Islam, which further increases its importance. However, a claim could be made that it is no one's first language, since Arab children acquire their local dialect in the natural process of generational language transmission, and learn Standard Arabic at a later point when they begin formal education. Proficiency in Standard Arabic gives one an insight into a vast literary tradition spanning over 1 500 years. However, proponents of recognizing local Arabic dialects as official languages, claim that the discrepancy between spoken vernaculars and Standard Arabic is just too wide, rendering proficiency in Standard Arabic unattainable for most.

In Egyptian Arabic 
Egyptian linguistic separatism is the most well-developed linguistic separatism in the Arab World. The most popular platform diffusing the idea of the Modern Egyptian Language (rather than the Egyptian dialect) is the Egyptian Arabic Wikipedia also known as Wikipedia Masry or Maṣrī. It was the first Wikipedia written in one of the many Arabic dialects. Importantly, the idea of Egyptian Linguistic Separatism goes further back to thinkers such as Salama Musa, Bayyūmī Qandīl, Muḥsin Luṭfī as-Sayyid, and The Liberal Egyptian Party. 

Egyptian linguistic separatism does not simply make a claim that Egyptian Arabic should become the official language of Egypt, which in and of itself is a matter decided by politicians, not linguists. However, proponents of Egyptian linguistic separatism, such as Bayyūmī Qandīl, substantiate their political demands with pseudoscientific claims. In his book Ḥāḍir aṯ-Ṯaqāfa fī Miṣr (The Present State of Culture in Egypt) which is a polemic with Ṭaha Ḥusayn’s Mustaqbal aṯ-Ṯaqāfa fī Miṣr (“The Future of Culture in Egypt”), Bayyūmī Qandīl says the Modern Egyptian language is a direct descendant of the Ancient Egyptian language. As the fourth stage of the Ancient Egyptian language (the other three being hieroglyphic, demotic, and Coptic), the Modern Egyptian language is claimed to be Hamitic, not Semitic in origin. These ideas are contrary to virtually all serious scholarship, which agrees that Egyptian Arabic belongs to the Semitic branch of the Afroasiatic Language Family, which has no Hamitic branch at all. 

Linguistic separatism remains a fringe movement within the Egyptian society. The idea remains particularly attractive to Coptic Christians and liberals, who see Egyptian Nationalism as an alternative to Pan-Arabism and Pan-Islamism.

In Catalan and Occitan

Common characteristics 
In the Occitano-Catalan language area, language secessionism is a quite recent phenomenon that has developed only since the 1970s. Language secessionism affects both Occitan and Catalan languages with the following common features:

 A breakaway from the tradition of Occitan and Catalan revivalist movements, which usually claim the unity of both languages since the 19th century.
 An often deliberate ignorance of the tradition of Romance linguistics that also claims the unity of Occitan and Catalan.
 An exacerbation of the cultural identity linked to dialects, which secessionism considers as separate languages.
 A lack of success (or a very marginal position) in linguistic scientific research.
 An active lobbying in regional political circles.
 The support of a writing system or of any prescription, which breaks up linguistic unity and exaggerates dialectal particular features.

In Catalan 
In Catalan, there are three cases:
 Valencian language secessionism, or blaverism, appeared during the democratic transition at the end of the 1970s, after the fall of Francoism. It is supported by some conservative circles of the Valencian society, which are branded as "post-Francoist" by its rivals who consider Valencian and Catalan one and the same language. It has variable impact in the population: Valencian people usually name their language "Valencian" but are divided about the unity of Catalan: some people agree in that "Valencian" is just the regional name for "Catalan" but other people think that "Valencian" would be a distinct language from "Catalan". Blaverism has very little impact in the community of linguists. Valencian institutions and Valencian partisans of Catalan unity use the official norm of Catalan (as codified by Institut d'Estudis Catalans and Acadèmia Valenciana de la Llengua), while "Blavers" (partisans of blaverism) mostly write Valencian using an alternative standard called "Normes del Puig" (codified by the Royal Academy of Valencian Culture).
 Balearic language secessionism vis-à-vis Catalan is quite marginal and is supported by a few cultural groups. It has very little impact in the population. It is included in a wider (but unorganized) tendency called "gonellisme", which struggles against the standardization of Catalan.
 In Franja de Ponent (a Catalan-speaking strip in eastern Aragon), language secessionism is quite marginal. It appeared during the 2000s. It is supported only by a fraction of the already minority pro-Aragonese movements, who overstate a so-called Aragonese ancestry in the Catalan spoken in Aragon.

In Occitan 
There are three cases in Occitan:
 In the Auvernhat dialect, language secessionism has been supported since the 1970s by Pierre Bonnaud, who founded the Bonnaudian norm, the group Cercle Terre d'Auvergne and the review Bïzà Neirà. It has negligible impact in the population, where knowledge of the language is in any case at best residual. Auvernhat cultural circles are divided between the unitary vision of Occitan (associated with the Occitan classical norm) and secessionism (associated with Bonnaudian norm).
 In the Provençal dialect, language secessionism appeared during the 1970s with Louis Bayle and has been reactivated since the 1990s by Philippe Blanchet and groups like "Union Provençale" and "Collectif Provence". This secessionism supports the Mistralian norm (but it does not represent all Mistralian norm users, since some of them claim traditionally the unity of Occitan). It has little impact in the population, whose knowledge of the language is anyway residual. Provençal cultural circles are divided between the unitary vision (supported by users of both Mistralian norm and classical norm) and the secessionist vision (supported by one some users of the Mistralian norm). The Regional Council of Provence-Alpes-Côte d'Azur voted a resolution on 5 December 2003 that approved the principle of the unity of "Occitan or Langue d'Oc" and the fact that Provençal is a part of it.
 In the Gascon dialect, language secessionism is claimed since the 1990s by Jean Lafitte, who created during the 2000s a group called "Institut Béarnais et Gascon". It has negligible impact in the population. Lafitte's secessionism supports two original writing systems: one is a nonstandard spin-off from the classical norm and the other one is a nonstandard spin-off from the Mistralian norm. Gascon cultural circles almost unanimously support the unitary vision of the Occitan language. In Aran Valley (a little Gascon Occitan-speaking area in Spain), Aranese, the local variety of Gascon, is officially recognized as a part of the Occitan language. The status of semi-autonomy of Aran Valley (1990) presents Gascon Aranese as "Aranese, the variety of the Occitan language peculiar to Aran ("Er aranés, varietat dera lengua occitana e pròpia d'Aran"). Similarly, the status of autonomy of Catalonia, as reformed in 2006, confirms it with the following expression: "The Occitan language, which is named Aranese in Aran" ("Era lengua occitana, denominada aranés en Aran").

In Spanish

In Andalusia, there is a fringe movement aimed at promoting the Andalusian dialect as a separate language from Spanish.

In Hindi and Urdu

The national language of Pakistan and official languages in many parts of India, the Delhi dialect has become the basis of Modern Standard Hindi and Modern Standard Urdu. Grammatically, Hindi and Urdu are the same language, Hindustani, but they differ in their literary and academic vocabulary. Hindi tends to adopt Sanskrit words and purges literary words borrowed from Persian, while Urdu does the opposite. In essence, apart from their scripts, the lexicon is what distinguishes Urdu and Hindi. There are additional Indo-Aryan languages that are counted as Hindi but are not the same as Hindustani. They are considered Hindi languages but may not be close to the Delhi dialect.

In Romanian 

The official standard language of Moldova is identical to Romanian. However, Vasile Stati, a local linguist and politician, has asserted his opinion that Moldovan is a separate language in his Dicționar moldovenesc-românesc (Moldovan–Romanian dictionary).During the Soviet era, the USSR authorities officially recognized and promoted Moldovans and Moldovan as a distinct ethnicity and language from Romanians. A Cyrillic alphabet was introduced in the Moldavian ASSR and SSR to reinforce this claim. Since 1989, the official language switched to the Latin script and underwent several of the language reforms of Romanian.

Nowadays, the Cyrillic alphabet remains in official use only on the territories controlled by the breakaway authorities of the Pridnestrovian Moldavian Republic (most commonly known as Transnistria), where it is named "Moldovan", as opposed to the Latin script version used elsewhere, which the local authorities call "Romanian".

 In Serbo-Croatian 

Serbo-Croatian has a strong structural unity, according to the vast majority of linguists who specialize in Slavic languages.  However, the language is spoken by populations that have strong, different, national consciousnesses: Bosniaks, Croats, Montenegrins, and Serbs.

Since the breakup of Yugoslavia in 1991, Serbo-Croatian has lost its unitary codification and its official unitary status. It is now divided into four official languages which follow separate codifications: Bosnian, Croatian, Montenegrin and Serbian. This process has been accused of being grounded on pseudoscientific claims fueled by political agendas.

Indeed, linguists, and specially sociolinguists, have not ceased to speak of a common Serbo-Croatian. It is a pluricentric language being cultivated through four voluntarily diverging normative varieties, Croatian, Bosnian, Montenegrin and Serbian, which are sometimes considered Ausbau languages. However, Ausbau languages must have different dialect basis, whereas standardized Croatian, Bosnian, Montenegrin and Serbian have the same dialect basis (Štokavian, specifically the Eastern Herzegovinian dialect).

On the contrary, the Serbo-Croatian kind of language secessionism is now a strongly consensual and institutional majority phenomenon. Still, this does not make it legitimate to say that such secessionism has led to "Ausbau languages" in the cases of Croatian, Bosnian, Montenegrin and Serbian, because such diversion has not taken place:

 In Galician-Portuguese 

The Portuguese kingdom, a former southern county split from the Kingdom of Galicia and fief of the Kingdom of León, was created by Afonso I of Portugal in 1126 and expanded towards the Islamic south, like its neighbouring kingdoms. That part of Galicia, named Portugal, became independent while the northern part of the country remained under the Kingdom of León during the 12th century and early 13th century. Northern Galicia would later be ruled by the Kingdom of Castile, which would become the core and ethnic base for the future Spain; but the culture was the same on both sides of the political border. Galician-Portuguese culture attained great prestige during the Low Middle Ages. In the late 15th century, Castilian domination became harder, banishing their language in all official uses, including the church.

Galician-Portuguese survived diglossically for the following centuries among the peasant population, but it experienced a strong Spanish influence and had a different evolution. Meanwhile, the same language (for the reintegrationist view) remained fully official in Portugal and was carried across the world by Portuguese explorers, soldiers and colonists.

During the 19th century a revival movement arose. This movement defended the Galician language, and created a provisional norm, with a Castilian orthography and many loanwords. When autonomy was granted, a norm and orthography (based in rexurdimento writers) (Galician literature) for a Galician language was created. This norm is taught and used in schools and universities of Galicia. But most writers (Castelao, Risco, Otero Pedrayo) did not support the traditional Galician forms; some of them based in Spanish orthography even if they recognized the essential linguistic unity, saying that the priority was achieving political autonomy and being read by the population. Other writers wrote with a Portuguese-like orthography (e.g. Guerra da Cal and Carvalho Calero).

Reintegrationists claim that the official norm (released in 1982) was imposed by the Spanish government, with the covert intent of severing Galician from Portuguese. But this idea is rejected by the Real Academia Galega, which supports the official norm.

Reintegrationist and Lusist groups are protesting against this so-called language secessionism, which they call Castrapism (from castrapo, something like "patois") or Isolationism. Unlike in the case of Valencian Blaverism, isolationism has no impact in the scientific community of linguists, and it is supported for a small number of them but still has clear political support.

Galician-Portuguese linguistic unity until the 16th century seems to be consensus, as does both Galician and European Portuguese being closer to each other, and also closer in the 19th century than in the 20th century and now. For example, European Portuguese had splits that created two new vowel phonemes, one of them usually an allophone only in the case of vowel reduction and the other phonetically absent in any other variant. Some dialects had a merger of three of its oral diphthongs and another three of its nasal vowels, and together with Brazilian Portuguese absorbed more than 5000 loanwords from French as well as 1500 from English.

It seems that the debate for a greater integration among Portuguese-speaking countries had the result of a single writing standard (1990 Portuguese Language Orthographic Agreement), often shunned by some segments of Portuguese media and population but long waited and cheered by Brazilians despite occasional criticism to some aspects and that changed the spelling of between 0.5% and 1% of the words in both former varieties, with minor respect to major dialect phonological differences. The other debate, whether Galician should use the same standard of Portuguese (Lusism), a standard with minor differences (Reintegrationism), a re-approximation of both through another Lusophone spelling agreement that would give particular regional differences such as that of Galician as well as major diverging dialects of Portuguese (especially in South America) more room (Reintegrationism), or the present standard based on the Spanish orthography, still did not cast official attention of government authorities in any of the involved countries, even if Lusophone support is expected to be strong in any of the first three cases.

In Tagalog
Republic Act No. 7104, approved on August 14, 1991, created the Commission on the Filipino Language, reporting directly to the President and tasked to undertake, coordinate and promote researches for the development, propagation and preservation of Filipino and other Philippine languages. On May 13, 1992, the commission issued Resolution 92-1, specifying that Filipino is the

Though the Commission on the Filipino Language recognizes that a lot of the vocabulary of Filipino is based on Tagalog, the latest definition given to the national language tries to evade the use of the term Tagalog.

According to some Filipinologists (people who specialize in the study of Filipino as a language), the main reason that Filipino is distinct from Tagalog is that in Filipino, there is a presence of vocabulary coming from other Philippine languages, such as Cebuano (such as bana – husband), Hiligaynon (such as buang – insane) and Ilocano (such as ading – little brother). They also maintain that the term Tagalog is the language of the Katagalugan or the Tagalog Region and puristic in a sense. It lacks certain phonemes like /f/ and /v/, which makes it incapable of producing some indigenous proper nouns Ifugao and Ivatan. Curiously, proponents of language secessionism are unable to account for the glaring absence of long vowel, phonemic in Tausug, in Filipino phonology or for the absence of a schwa. Arguments for secessionism generally ignore the fact that the various languages of the Philippines have divergent phonologies.

 In Chinese 

 Mandarin versus other dialects 
Among Chinese speakers, Yue Chinese (Cantonese), Hokkien and other varieties of Chinese are often referred to as dialects, instead of languages, despite the fact that those varieties are not mutually intelligible with Mandarin, spoken by the majority of Chinese. However, the languages are reportedly significantly more mutually intelligible in written form as all varieties continue to use the same set of Hanzi (Chinese characters); i.e. Yue and Mandarin differ primarily in tonal differences and different pronunciations of various sounds which would be largely negated in writing.

 In Hokkien 
In the Hokkien topolect, which is widely used in Fujian, Taiwan, and in the Chinese diaspora, it is debated that whether Taiwanese dialects should be separated from the Hokkien language as the Taiwanese language, although people from Fujian and Taiwan can communicate with each other despite some differences in vocabulary. Such debates may be associated with politics of Taiwan.

In Taiwan, there is a common perception that Hokkien preserves more archaic features from Classical Chinese than Mandarin, thus allowing poetry from the Tang dynasty to rhyme better. Amongst Hokkien nationalists in Taiwan, this perception is sometimes elevated into stronger claims about the identity of Hokkien and Mandarin. The character reading is interpreted to be a reference to the Yellow River Map and the Lo Shu Square and taken as evidence that the ancestors of Hokkien-speaking people came from the Central Plain, and in preserving their identity over the centuries, Hokkien speakers have also better preserved their language. Some fringe scholars claim that modern Hokkien is a faithfully preserved archaic variety of Chinese once used in the imperial courts dating back as early as the Shang dynasty. Another claim based on folk etymology is that the word Mandarin'' is based on the Mandarin pronunciation of the Chinese phrase . This is taken as evidence that Mandarin has been corrupted by foreign influence from Manchu, Mongolian, etc. and is thus not fit to be the official language of a Chinese-speaking country. This is in contrast to more mainstream views that Taiwanese Hokkien, as a variety of Southern Min, is a descendant of Proto-Min, a language that split from late Old Chinese, and Mandarin descended from Middle Chinese, and that it is not meaningful to say that one modern language is older than another.

See also

 Abstand and ausbau languages
 Blaverism
 Norms of El Puig
 Comparison of standard Bosnian, Croatian, Montenegrin and Serbian
 Dialect continuum
 Diasystem
 Diglossia
 Language ideology
 Language planning
 Language policy
 Language shift
 Mutual intelligibility
 Pluricentric language
 Separatism
 Standard language

Notes

Language varieties and styles
Sociolinguistics
Pseudoscience